Mervyn Archdall may refer to:

Mervyn Archdall (Irish antiquary) (1723–1791)
Mervyn Archdall (senior) (c. 1724–1813), colonel and MP for Fermanagh
Mervyn Archdall (junior) (1763–1839), general and MP for Fermanagh
Mervyn Edward Archdale (1812–1895), High Sheriff (1879) and MP for Fermanagh
Mervyn Archdall (bishop) (1831–1913), Bishop of Killaloe and Clonfert